Krasić is a South Slavic surname, derived from the word krasiti ("to adorn"). It may refer to:

Bojan Krasić (born 1983), Serbian footballer
Marko Krasić (born 1985), Serbian footballer
Miloš Krasić (born 1984), Serbian footballer
Stjepan Krasić, Croatian priest and historian

See also
Krasići, two settlements north of Tovrljane in the Toplica District, Serbia
Krašić, a village in central Croatia
Krasović, similar surname

Serbian surnames
Croatian surnames